North Haven is a town and island in Knox County, Maine, United States, in Penobscot Bay. The town is both a year-round island community and a prominent summer colony. The population was 417 at the 2020 census. North Haven is accessible by thrice-daily state ferry service from Rockland, or by air taxi from Knox County Regional Airport.

History

As early as 3300 BCE, the island was visited by the Red Paint People. Later it became part of the territory of the Penobscot Abenaki Indians, who hunted and fished in canoes along the coast. Captain Martin Pring, an explorer from Bristol, England, "discovered" North Haven and Vinalhaven in 1603. He called them the Fox Islands, a name that survives on the Fox Islands Thoroughfare, a strait separating the towns that provides passage for boats crossing Penobscot Bay.

Settled in the 1760s, North Haven was originally the North Island of Vinalhaven, from which it was set off and incorporated on June 30, 1846, as Fox Isle. It was changed to North Haven on July 13, 1847. In 1850 the state legislature passed an act that gave the majority of island inhabitants "the right to have such roads as they deemed fit." The majority thereupon decided to have no roads at all, or else roads obstructed with gates or bars at the discretion of landowners. Not surprisingly, the minority of inhabitants petitioned to amend the act.

Fishing and farming became chief occupations. The town's surface is even, and farmers produced hay as a staple crop. Boatbuilding became an important industry, and the community still has two boatyards. But many inhabitants were fishermen who caught lobsters, scallops and oysters.

Summer colony

In the 1880s, the island was discovered by "rusticators", seasonal residents first from Boston, then a decade or two later from New York and Philadelphia. North Haven is best known today for its sizable summer colony of prominent northeasterners, particularly Boston Brahmins, drawn to the island for over a century to savor its simple way of life. Among the more notable summer residents was the impressionist painter Frank Weston Benson, who rented the Wooster Farm as a summer home and painted several notable canvases set on the island.

The southern side of the Fox Islands Thoroughfare is often informally considered part of North Haven, since Vinalhaven's north shore is nearly a dozen miles from that community's town center. In contrast to Vinalhaven, North Haven's economy relies less on the lobster industry and more on sustaining its summer resort community. Energy for the community is partially provided by the wind project in Vinalhaven through the Fox Island Electric Cooperative. Although the island is a popular destination, it actually provides few tourist amenities—two inns, a grocery store, two seasonal restaurants, a pizza shop, and two gift shops—and is instead geared toward those with vacation homes on the island.

A small population of Mouflon sheep (native to Europe and western Asia) escaped from an animal enclosure owned by Thomas Watson, Jr. on the island in the 1990s and some of the original population survives today.

North Haven Dinghy
In 1885, William Weld challenged the yachtsmen of North Haven to a race. He used the tender from his yacht Gitana and unsuccessfully raced against a variety of sprit-sailed boats. That winter he went home and had a better dinghy designed and built in Salem, Massachusetts. The next year he beat all contenders. The boat was hauled out at North Haven, and two copies were made by Henry Calderwood. The subsequent race was between Mrs. Cobb, Miss Spencer and Miss Hayward. The first boats had spritsails, but this soon gave way to gaff rigs. In 1888, James Osman Brown built four more dinghies. This was at the beginning of J. O. Brown & Sons boatyard. The racing fleet grew over the years. They are still raced out of North Haven's sailing club, the North Haven Casino, making them the oldest continuously raced class in the United States.

Geography
It is in Penobscot Bay and the Gulf of Maine, part of the Atlantic Ocean.

Demographics

2000 census
As of the census of 2000, there were 381 people, 162 households, and 109 families residing in the town. The racial makeup of the town was 95.28% White, 1.05% African American, 3.15% from other races, and 0.52% from two or more races. Hispanic or Latino of any race were 2.36% of the population.

There were 162 households, of which 29.0% had children under 18 living with them, 57.4% were married couples living together, 4.3% had a female householder with no husband present, and 32.7% were non-families. 27.8% of all households were made up of individuals, and 10.5% had someone living alone who was 65 or older. The average household size was 2.35 and the average family size was 2.86.

In the town, the population was spread out, with 25.2% under 18, 5.2% from 18 to 24, 30.2% from 25 to 44, 27.0% from 45 to 64, and 12.3% who were 65 or older. The median age was 39. For every 100 females, there were 103.7 males. For every 100 females 18 and over, there were 112.7 males.

The median income for a household in the town was $40,446, and the median income for a family was $42,361. Males had a median income of $31,071 versus $16,000 for females. The per capita income was $17,112. About 4.4% of families and 7.2% of the population were below the poverty line, including 2.8% of those under 18 and 6.3% of those 65 or over.

2010 census
As of the census of 2010, there were 355 people, 165 households, and 105 families residing in the town. The racial makeup of the town was 96.9% White, 0.3% African American, 0.3% Asian, 0.6% from other races, and 2.0% from two or more races. Hispanic or Latino of any race were 2.3% of the population.

There were 165 households, of which 23.0% had children under 18 living with them, 49.1% were married couples living together, 11.5% had a female householder with no husband present, 3.0% had a male householder with no wife present, and 36.4% were non-families. 29.7% of all households were made up of individuals, and 9.6% had someone living alone who was 65 or older. The average household size was 2.15 and the average family size was 2.62.

The median age in the town was 44.5. 20% of residents were under 18; 5.6% were between 18 and 24; 25.9% were from 25 to 44; 29.1% were from 45 to 64; and 19.4% were 65 or older. The gender makeup of the town was 52.4% male and 47.6% female.

Education
North Haven is unusual among Maine island communities in offering a K–12 school; most islands have only elementary schools and send their high school students to schools on the mainland (Vinalhaven, Mount Desert Island, and Islesboro are the only other islands to offer K–12 education). North Haven Community School is one of Maine's smallest public schools. Its motto is "Competence, Compassion, Challenge and Community." Notable alumni include Hannah Pingree, who served as Maine's Speaker of the House of Representatives for two terms.

Notable people 

 Angela Adams, designer
 Frank Weston Benson, artist with summer home on North Haven
 Harold Beverage, electrical engineer and inventor
 Elizabeth Bishop, poet
 Jonathan Bush, banker
 Henry N. Cobb, architect
 Pierre S. du Pont IV, politician
 J. Christopher Flowers, banker
 Ned Lamont, politician
 Burke Marshall, lawyer, professor
 Susan Minot, writer
 Robert Montgomery, actor
 Dwight Morrow, ambassador
 Chellie Pingree, U.S. representative, Maine Senate majority leader
 Hannah Pingree, former speaker of the Maine House of Representatives
 Nicholas Platt, US ambassador
 Oliver Platt, actor
 Matthew Simmons, investment banker
 John Sirica, U.S. District Court Judge, Watergate figure
 Herbert Eustis Winlock, Egyptologist 
 Wilford Woodruff, 4th president of the LDS Church, spent August 1837 to May 1838 on North Haven and in 1838 led 53 new members to Missouri but continued to Nauvoo, Illinois, after the 1838 Missouri Mormon War

See also
 List of islands of Maine
 Vinalhaven, Maine

References

External links

 Town of North Haven, Maine
 North Haven Library
 North Haven Conservation Partners

Islands of Knox County, Maine
Towns in Knox County, Maine
Towns in Maine
Populated coastal places in Maine
Islands of Maine
Coastal islands of Maine